The Revolutionary Communist Youth Brigade (RCYB) was the former youth group of the Revolutionary Communist Party, USA.

History 
The group was launched in 1977.

It was founded as the Attica Brigade, and then was renamed the Revolutionary Student Brigade. RCYB’s ultimate objective is to help create “a world of for-real Communism; a world where a few rich nations don’t oppress and dominate the globe; where whites don’t lord over non-whites; where men don’t dominate over women; and where one class of people doesn’t exploit the rest.”

Activities 
During its existence, the most famous member of the RCYB was Gregory Lee "Joey" Johnson. During the 1984 Republican National Convention in Dallas, Texas, he burned the United States flag to protest the policies of the Reagan administration. Johnson was arrested and convicted, but had his conviction overturned on appeal. The State of Texas then sought and obtained review by the Supreme Court. In Texas v. Johnson, a five-justice majority of the court held that Johnson’s act of flag burning was protected speech under the First Amendment to the United States Constitution.

In 1978 Revolutionary Communist Youth Brigade published Minorities and whites, unite to smash the Bakke decision!

In 1979 they protested nuclear weapons.

In 1989 Antonin Scalia and four others justices ruled that a Revolutionary Communist Youth Brigade member's right to burn the US flag was a protected right.

In 1991 they protested American involvement in the Persian Gulf, and members were arrested.

In 1992 they participated in agitation and organization efforts during the Rodney King protests and uprising in Los Angeles.

References

Youth wings of political parties in the United States
Youth wings of communist parties
Defunct Maoist organizations in the United States
Revolutionary Communist Party, USA
Left-wing militant groups in the United States